Thadiyoor is a town located in Mallappally and Ranni taluks of Pathanamthitta district. It is part of both Ezhumattoor and Ayroor Panchayaths. It is Approximately 18kms from Thiruvalla and 11kms from Ranni.

Waterfalls

Charal Kunnu grounds

Landmarks 
 Edakkadu Market
 NSS Higher Secondary School  
 BSNL Telephone Exchange 
 Carmel Convent English Medium School (CBSE)
Y's Men Club Thadiyoor
YMCA Thadiyoor 
Lions Club Thadiyoor
MCRD
 SreeKantheshwaram mahadeva Temple

Transportation
Thadiyoor does not have a bus station, but it does have buses connecting to all 3 directions Thiruvalla, Kozhenchery and Ranni.
Geographically Thadiyoor is in key position to travel to Thiruvalla, Ranni, Sabarimala (Pamba) and other places.

Weekly markets
Thadiyoor is the only village with a private market, open on every Wednesday and Saturday in the region.

Temples
The main temples in the area include Aruvikkuzhi Sreekrishna Swami Kshetram, Palakuzhi SreeKantheshwaram mahadeva Kshetram, Sree Puthen Sabarimala Dharma shastha Kshetram, Thelliyoor Kavu Devi Kshetram, Thadiyoor Sree Raja Rajeswari (Jayadhurga), Bhadrakali Kshetram, Palolikkavu Devi Kshetram and Malampara Malayacchan Kshetram.

Churches
St. Ignatious Jacobite Syrian Church, Bethel Marthoma Church, IPC Horeb Church, Church of God in India, Salem Marthoma Church, Immanuel Marthoma Church, St Antonys' Catholic Church, St Francis Xaviour Catholic Church, St Agnes Malankara Catholic Church, Orthodox, Brethren Church, Assemblies of God Church.

References 

Villages in Pathanamthitta district